Khin Khin Htoo (born 17 December 1965) is a Mandalay-based Myanmar National Literature Award winning writer. Her works are known for their coverage of the traditional Burmese culture, and beauty of Burmese people of Upper Myanmar. She is the only one daughter of the 6 siblings. She is married to Nay Win Myint, also a writer. She has a daughter named Phway Phway Nay Win Myint.

Khin Khin Htoo entered the Burmese literary scene in 1993 with the short story Pann Pan Ba Ya Ze (Please Let Me Wear the Flower). She has written over one hundred short stories and numerous articles on sports, one of her hobbies. Her novellas has been directed as films. “Kyo Tann”, “Pan Kyar Wut Hmone”, “Mingalar Hlae” and upcoming “Kha Mae Kyo” are films based on her novellas. She is most well-known for her novel “Ma Eain Kan” (Miss Eain Kan) a suspense, true story of a beautiful woman of greed. Many people admired her as she is rated as one of the best female authors in Myanmar. Her upcoming novel “Hlay Thagyi Kadaw” (The Wife Of The Sailor) is based on the life of her parents and herself. “Kha Mae Kyo” (The Holy String)/ “Ma Eain Kan” (Miss Eain Kan)/ Pan Kyar Wut Hmone (The Moon Lotus)/ “Taw Minthamee” (The Small Town Dancer) and “Phat Sein Koon Down Shwe Wut Htu To Myar” are the best-written and most famous novellas. Her fans like her novellas as she is clear and direct writer with digestive writing. She often writes novellas about her daughter, her brothers, her parents and her town. She has gone to many countries such as UAE, China, Singapore, Malaysia and Thailand along with her literature works.

Works

Short story collections
 1999– Thanakha Pwint Wuttu-to Myar –
 2001– San-yit Wine Wuttu-to Myar –
 2002– Phat Sein Kyun Taung Shwe Wuttu-to Mya –
 2004– Myo-ka-lay Ei Kaw Phet Set-kuu (with Thiek Htin Thet)  –
 2006– Pa Kyut Kya Wuttu-to Myar –
 2006– Zay Chin Taung Wuttu-to Myar –
 2007– Kyar Sit Kyo Magazine Wuttu-shae Myar –
 2007– Sapae Tin Hmae Magazine Wuttu-shae Myar (with Nay Win Myint) –
 2008– Poe Yi Taung Sar Magazine Wuttu-shae Myar (with Nay Win Myint) –
 2008 – Hlae Yin Kyawt Wuttu-to Myar –
 2008 – Let Ywe Sin Wuttu-to Myar –
 2009 – Yet Kan Lwin Wuttu-to Myar –
 2009 – Pan See Kyo Magazine Wuttu-shae Myar –

Novella

Novels
 2006– Wutt Lae Taw Shwe-Pa-So Tan Htoe Lo' Kyo Mal –
 2006– Anyar Thu Anyar Thar Kyun-ma Swe Myo Myar –
 2007– Ma Eain Kan (described in Shwe Amyu Te Magazine, from June 2007 to April 2010) –
 2008– Sue Pann Khwai Thwe Bayet Hnint Pay Ywat Leik Nahtaung Sin (currently described in Mahaythi Magazine, since December 2008 ) –
 2009– Pann Kyar Wutt Hmone –
2014- Taw Minthamee

Non-fiction
 2000– Footballer Heroes I Love –
 2009– Pae Thin Kyauk (Anyar Dalei Ywa Dalei) –

Awards 
 2003 : Myanmar National Literature Award for Collected Short Stories for Phat Sein Kyun Taung Shwe Wuttu-to Mya.

References

External links

 Pwe short story by Khin Khin Htoo
 Ma Eain Kan Ma Eain Kan (Burmese language) by Khin Khin Htoo at Shwe Amyutei Magazine.

1965 births
Living people
Burmese writers
People from Mandalay
20th-century Burmese women writers
21st-century Burmese women writers
20th-century Burmese writers
21st-century Burmese writers